Norman Henry Fender (2 September 1910 – 24 October 1983) was a Welsh dual-code international rugby footballer who played rugby union for Cardiff as a flanker and rugby league with York. He won six caps for Wales at rugby union, and also represented Wales at rugby league. In 1932/33 he toured Australasia with Great Britain.

Playing career

International honours
Norman Fender won caps for Wales (RU) while at Cardiff RFC in 1930 against Ireland, and France, and in 1931 against England, Scotland, France, and Ireland, represented Great Britain (RL) while at York on the 1932/33 tour to Australasia playing in 14 tour (non-Test matches), scoring 11-tries, and won caps for Wales (RL) while at York 1932...1938 9-caps.

County Cup Final appearances
Norman Fender played , and scored a goal in York's 9–2 victory over Wakefield Trinity in the 1936 Yorkshire County Cup Final during the 1936–37 season at Headingley Rugby Stadium, Leeds on Saturday 17 October 1936.

Club career
Norman Fender made his début for York on Saturday 29 August 1931, and played his last match on Sunday 18 September 1938.

Honoured at York Rugby League
The first seven players to be inducted into the York Rugby League Hall of Fame during March 2013 were; Geoffrey Pryce, Gary Smith, Vic Yorke, Norman Fender, Willie Hargreaves, Basil Watts and Edgar Dawson.

Bibliography

References

External links
!Great Britain Statistics at englandrl.co.uk (statistics currently missing due to not having appeared for both Great Britain, and England)
Fender the first of York's Lions
Fender gets the plaudits

1910 births
1983 deaths
British publicans
Cardiff RFC players
Dual-code rugby internationals
Rugby league locks
Rugby league players from Cardiff
Rugby union flankers
Rugby union players from Cardiff
Wales international rugby union players
Wales national rugby league team players
Welsh rugby league players
Welsh rugby union players
York Wasps players